The following is a timeline of the history of the city of Lusaka, Zambia.

20th century

 1905
 Railway begins operating.
 European settlement formed.
 1913 - Village Management Board established.
 1926 - "District administrative headquarters" relocated to Lusaka from Chilanga (approximate date).
 1935 - Capital of British Protectorate of Northern Rhodesia relocated to Lusaka from Livingstone.
 1937 - City of Lusaka Football Club formed.
 1948 - Central African Post newspaper begins publication.
 1950 - Population: 27,100.
 1951 - Lusaka Playhouse built.
 1952 - African Listener radio programme begins broadcasting.
 1954 - F. Payne becomes mayor.
 1956 - Lusaka African Marketeers' Cooperative Society organized.
 1958 - Waddington Theatre Club founded.
 1959 - 20th Century cinema opens (approximate date).
 1960
 Lusaka attains city status.
 African Mail newspaper begins publication.
 Palace cinema opens (approximate date).
 Luburma market established (approximate date).
 1963
 National Archives of Zambia headquartered in city.
 International School of Lusaka founded.
 Population: 87,495.
 1964
 City becomes capital of the newly independent Republic of Zambia.
 Independence Stadium (Zambia) opens.
 1965 - Rhodes Park School established.
 1966 - University of Zambia founded.
 1967 - Mtendele "squatter township" opens.
 1968
 Zambia Daily Mail newspaper in publication.
 Sister city relationship established with Los Angeles, US.
 1969 - Zambian News Agency headquartered in city.
 1970
 "Greater Lusaka created."
 September: International 3rd Summit of the Non-Aligned Movement held in city.
 1971 - Chikwakwa Theatre established at the University of Zambia.
 1972
 Chunga market built.
 Population: 448,000 urban agglomeration.
 1976
 Housing Project Unit established.
 United Nations Institute for Namibia inaugurated.
 Libala, Kaunda Square, and Longacres markets established (approximate date).
 1978 - Racial unrest.
 1979
 August: City hosts Commonwealth Heads of Government Meeting 1979.
 Zambia Consumer Buying Corporation opens.
 1980 - Population: 498,837 city; 535,830 urban agglomeration.
 1985
 Zanaco Football Club formed.
 Non-governmental Organisations' Co-ordinating Committee established.
 1990 - Population: 982,362 city.
 1991 - Weekly Post'' newspaper begins publication (approximate date).
 1994
 Lusaka Stock Exchange opens.
 Common Market for Eastern and Southern Africa headquartered in Lusaka.
 1996 - Lusaka National Museum opens.
 1997
 Umar Al Farook mosque opens.
 Sustainable Lusaka Project launched.
 1999 - University of Lusaka founded.
 2000 - Population: 1,057,212.

21st century

 2001 - Munali Girls High School established.
 2001 - Independent Churches of Zambia (ICOZ) established. ICOZ was Founded by Rev David Musonda Masupa with the help of the 2nd Republican President Fredrick Chiluba.
 2006 - October: Post-election unrest.
 2010
 Daniel Chisenga becomes mayor.
 Population: 1,747,152.
 2012 - February: Celebration of Zambia's winning 2012 Africa Cup of Nations.
 2017 - March: Stampede occurs.

References

Bibliography

Published in 20th century
 
 
 
 
 
 
 
 
 
 

Published in 21st century

External links

  (Bibliography of open access  articles)
  (Images, etc.)
  (Images, etc.)
  (Bibliography)
  (Bibliography)
  (Bibliography)
 

.
 01
Lusaka
Years in Zambia
Lusaka